Doc Barclay's Daughters is an American old-time radio soap opera. It was broadcast on CBS from January 23, 1939, to January 19, 1940.

Format
Despite his nickname, Doc Barclay was actually a druggist in Brookdale. The daughters referred to in the title were all grown women. Connie, the oldest, had returned home after a failed marriage to a "millionaire playboy." Mimi, the middle daughter and wife of a clerk at a hardware store, resented Connie's affluence. Marge, the youngest and unmarried, kept house for her father and was more stable than her sisters.

The series was one of many created by the husband-and-wife team of Frank and Anne Hummert. It was sponsored by Personal Finance Company, a loan service firm.

Personnel
Bennet Kilpack had the role of Doc Barclay. Other members of the cast and their roles are shown in the table below.

Source: Variety Radio Directory (1940-1941)

Ann Leaf was the organist, and Tom Shirley was the announcer. Writers for the program included Charles S. Moore, John De Witt, and Eleanor Berdon.

References 

1939 radio programme debuts
1940 radio programme endings
1930s American radio programs
1940s American radio programs
CBS Radio programs
American radio dramas
American radio soap operas